Francine Haskins (born February 10, 1947), a Washington, D.C. native, is an American multi-media fiber artist and book illustrator. She was one of the original founders of 1800 Belmont Arts, an African- American black art collective in Washington, D.C. (1991-–2001).

Early life and education
Haskins was born in 1947, one of two children born to Thomas Haskins, a North Carolina railroad worker who later worked as a waiter in the United States Senate Dining Hall, and Frances Datcher Haskins, who taught English at Terrell Junior High.  She grew up in segregated Washington, D.C. and attended McKinley Technical High School. She was a member of the Arts Club there. Haskins were influenced by her junior and senior year art teacher, Sam Gilliam.  In 1965, she majored in advertising design at the Corcoran School of Art because she thought "it was the only way you could make a living as an artist." Corcoran professor and printmaker Percy Martin introduced Haskins to architect and community activist Topper Carew of the New Thing Art and Architecture Center.  In 1970, she worked in the art department of The New Thing creating posters, brochures and teaching art to neighborhood children.

Artwork
Haskins later worked 13 years for the department store Garfinckel's on the sales floor and in the buying office. Haskins started creating her own note cards and dolls featuring everyday African American life because she noticed a lack of such product in retail stores.  By 1985, Haskins left Garfinckel's to become a fulltime working artist showing her works at art fairs, Black memorabilia shows and through commissions.

In the early 1990s, Harriet Rohmer, head of Children's Book Press, saw Haskins' illustrations on a sweatshirt at a bookfair and sought Haskins out to create a book with African American characters. Haskins reflected on her childhood in Washington, D.C., and wrote and illustrated I Remember 121 (1990) and Things I Like About Grandma (1991).  The initial print run for I Remember 121 was 10,000 books and was used in "several urban school districts."

In 1993, Haskins directed first graders in painting a mural on an outside wall at Shepherd Park Elementary School in Washington, D.C.

The National Museum of African American History and Culture gift shop has included handmade dolls by Haskins since 2016.

1800 Belmont Arts
Washington, D.C. resident Rashida Mims conceived a community space dedicated to Black art and culture. In 1991, she, her husband Jamal Mims and a few other artists opened 1800 Belmont Arts, a Victorian home at 1800 Belmont Road, NW in the Adams Morgan neighborhood. Rooms in the home were divided into retail spaces. Haskins opened her studio there in 1991 and sold her artwork to the public. For several years, Haskins also taught hand-made dollmaking on Saturdays at her 1800 Belmont Arts studio.

The longest tenured artists at 1800 Belmont Arts included Haskins, Ampofo Designs, featuring ceramic sculpture of Ghanaian Kwabena Ampofo and textile designs by his wife, Heather, and the Graham Collection, featuring Black collectibles and memorabilia. The three-story home closed in 2001. A few of the retailers, including Haskins, then opened Belmont Arts East in the Brookland neighborhood in Washington, D.C. from 2001 to 2007.

Selected publications

Exhibitions

External links
 African American Dollmaking and Puppetry: Renegotiating Identity, Restoring Community. Webcast of panel discussion, including presentation by Haskins. Library of Congress, Washington, D.C., February 18, 2020.
 Nine Artists | Nine Months | Nine Perspectives: Birth of 2020 Visions. Video of panel discussion with the artists, including Haskins. Center for Book Arts, New York, NY, February 28, 2021.
Francine Haskins on the African American Visual Artists Database.

References

Living people
1947 births
People from Washington, D.C.
Artists from Washington, D.C.
Book artists
Dollmakers
Quilters
American women painters
American textile artists
African-American painters
African-American women artists
African-American contemporary artists
American contemporary artists
20th-century American women artists
21st-century American women artists
20th-century textile artists
21st-century textile artists
20th-century women textile artists
21st-century women textile artists
American children's book illustrators
Corcoran School of the Arts and Design alumni